Vliegen is a surname. Notable people with the surname include: 

 Joran Vliegen (born 1993), Belgian tennis player
 Kristof Vliegen (born 1982), Belgian tennis player
 Loïc Vliegen (born 1993), Belgian cyclist
 Olivier Vliegen (born 1999), Belgian footballer